The Resistance Tag Team Championship is a professional wrestling tag team championship currently promoted by the American promotion The Resistance. The inaugural champions were Aaron Epic and Suge D who won the titles at RPW Sad Wings Of Destiny on November 30, 2012. There have been 13 reigns and two vacancies disputed between 21 different champions. The current champions are Timmy Lou Retton and White Mike who are in their first reign.

Title history

Combined reigns

By team 

{| class="wikitable sortable" style="text-align: center"
!Rank
!Team
!No. ofreigns
!Combineddays
|-
!1
|style="background-color:#FFE6BD"| The Gym Nasty Boyz † || 1 || +
|-
!2
| Lock Up || 1 || 358
|-
!3
| Main Street Youth  || 2 || 315
|-
!4
| Mad Man Pondo and Shane Mercer || 1 || 245
|-
!5
| Body Magic || 1 || 225
|-
!6
| Corey Hollis and John Skyler || 1 || 182
|-
!7
| Da Soul Touchaz || 1 || 164
|-
!8
| Jocephus and Robert Anthony || 1 || 80
|-
!9
| Eve and Jocephus || 1 || 49
|-
!10
| Jay Bradley and Mad Man Pondo || 1 || <1
|-
!rowspan=2|11
| Hy-Zaya and Shane Mercer || 1 ||style="background-color:#bbeeff|N/A¤
|-
| Mojo McQueen and Yabo The Clown || 1 || style="background-color:#bbeeff|N/A¤

By wrestler 
{|class="wikitable sortable" style="text-align: center"
!Rank
!Wrestler
!data-sort-type="number"|No. ofreigns
!data-sort-type="number"|Combineddays	
|-
!rowspan=2|1
| style="background-color:#FFE6BD"| Timmy Lou Retton † || 1 || +
|-
| style="background-color:#FFE6BD"| White Mike † || 1 || +
|-
!rowspan=2|3
| Aaron Epic || 1 || 358
|-
| Suge D || 1 || 358
|-
!rowspan=2|5
| Jake Omen || 2 || 315
|-
| Scotty Young || 2 || 315
|-
!rowspan=2|7
| Mad Man Pondo || 2 || 245
|-
| Shane Mercer || 2 || 245
|-
!rowspan=2|9
| Brady Pierce || 1 || 225
|-
|Eric St. Vaughn || 1 || 225
|-
!rowspan=2|11
| Corey Hollis || 1 || 182
|-
| John Skyler || 1 || 182
|-
!rowspan=2|13
| Acid Jaz || 1 || 164
|-
| Willie Richardson || 1 || 164
|-
!15
| Jocephus || 2 || 129
|-
!16
| Robert Anthony || 1 || 80
|-
!17
| Eve || 1 || 49
|-
!18
| Jay Bradley || 1 || <1
|-
!rowspan=4|19
| Hy-Zaya || 1 || style="background-color:#bbeeff|N/A¤
|-
| Mojo McQueen || 1 || style="background-color:#bbeeff|N/A¤
|-
| Yabo The Clown || 1 || style="background-color:#bbeeff|N/A¤

References

External links
  Resistance Tag Team Championship
Tag team wrestling championships